Ryan Disraeli is an American businessman, and a co-founder and the CEO of TeleSign.

Early life and education
Raised in San Diego, California, Disraeli attended the University of Southern California (USC), where he studied business at USC Marshall School of Business. In 2018, Disraeli was awarded the USC Marshall School of Business Alumni Entrepreneur of the year award.

Career
In 2005, Disraeli, while he was a sophomore at USC, cofounded an online security service company, TeleSign, that protects online websites and users. Disraeli worked as a vice president of the company for fraud services and has helped expand TeleSign's communications platform-as-a-service (CPaaS) to any developer capable of invoking a REST Application Programming Interface (API). Disraeli helped TeleSign raise $78 Million dollars in funding and grow to annual revenues of more than $100 Million and hundreds of employees across the globe.

Disraeli regularly provides commentary in the area of behavioral biometrics and Multi-factor authentication. He also regularly comments on online security and fraud-related issues. In 2017, Disraeli was named to Forbes 30 under 30 for enterprise technology. Also in 2017, TeleSign was acquired for 230 million dollars by Belgacom ICS.

References

External links
 Silicon Dragon LA 2015: Tech Chat with TeleSign co-founder

Living people
University of Southern California alumni
Marshall School of Business alumni
American technology company founders
Businesspeople from San Diego
Businesspeople from Los Angeles
21st-century American businesspeople
Year of birth missing (living people)